Myrotoxin B is a macrocyclic trichothecene first isolated in 1985. It was tested on Swiss mice and found to be very toxic, though not the most toxic of the three toxins that were tested at that time. It has also been isolated from Myrothecium roridum, a pathogen leaf spot that affects mulberry, though it is unknown if it is used as a pathotoxin.

References

Trichothecenes
Acetate esters
Lactones
Epoxides
Secondary alcohols